Platensina voneda is a species of tephritid or fruit flies in the genus Platensina of the family Tephritidae.

Distribution
Afrotropical or Oriental Region.

References

Tephritinae
Insects described in 1849
Diptera of Asia